Miss República Dominicana 2001 was held on July 1, 2001. There were 24 candidates, representing provinces and municipalities, who entered. The winner would represent the Dominican Republic at Miss Universe 2002. The  Miss Internacional República Dominicana would enter Miss International 2001. The first runner up would enter in Miss Globe International 2002. The rest of finalist entered different pageants.

Results

Delegates

External links
Pageant Photos
https://web.archive.org/web/20141113002044/http://www.missamericalatina.com/Results.htm#_2001

Miss Dominican Republic
2001 beauty pageants
2001 in the Dominican Republic